Elīza Tīruma (also Cauce, born 21 August 1990) is a Latvian luger who has competed since 2006. She won a bronze medal at the 2014 Winter Olympics in the team relay event and placed 12th individually. Her sister Maija Tīruma is also an Olympic luger.

References

External links

Latvian female lugers
Living people
1990 births
Lugers at the 2014 Winter Olympics
Lugers at the 2018 Winter Olympics
Lugers at the 2022 Winter Olympics
Olympic lugers of Latvia
Olympic bronze medalists for Latvia
Olympic medalists in luge
Medalists at the 2014 Winter Olympics
Medalists at the 2022 Winter Olympics
People from Sigulda